Lucas Lee may refer to:
Lucas Lee (golfer), Brazilian golfer
 A character in comic book series Scott Pilgrim